The Proceedings of the Institution of Mechanical Engineers, Part G: Journal of Aerospace Engineering is a peer-reviewed scientific journal that covers research in applied sciences and technology dealing with aircraft and spacecraft, as well as their support systems. The journal was established in 1989 and is published by SAGE Publications on behalf of the Institution of Mechanical Engineers.

Abstracting and indexing 
The journal is abstracted and indexed in Scopus and the Science Citation Index. According to the Journal Citation Reports, its 2013 impact factor is 0.454, ranking it 20th out of 27 journals in the category "Engineering, Aerospace" and 102nd out of 126 journals in the category "Engineering, Mechanical".

References

External links 
 

Aerospace engineering journals
English-language journals
Institution of Mechanical Engineers academic journals
Publications established in 1989
SAGE Publishing academic journals
Journals published between 13 and 25 times per year